Kristiana Petlichka (Bulgarian Cyrillic: Кристиана Петличка) (born on 6 July 1994 in Sofia) is a former youth international volleyball player from Bulgaria who used to play for VC CSKA Sofia.

References

1994 births
Living people
Bulgarian women's volleyball players
Sportspeople from Sofia